XHS may refer to:

 XHS-FM, a radio station (100.9 FM) in Tampico, Tamaulipas, Mexico
 XHS-TDT, a television station (channel 23, virtual 4) in Ensenada, Baja California, Mexico